The 1929 Victorian state election was held on 30 November 1929.

Retiring Members

Nationalist
Edmund Greenwood MLA (Nunawading)

Country
Sir John Bowser MLA (Wangaratta and Ovens)
Alfred Downward MLA (Mornington)

Legislative Assembly
Sitting members are shown in bold text. Successful candidates are highlighted in the relevant colour. Where there is possible confusion, an asterisk (*) is also used.

See also
1928 Victorian Legislative Council election

References

Psephos - Adam Carr's Election Archive

Victoria
Candidates for Victorian state elections